Gregory Thane Wyler (born 12 November 1969) is an American tech entrepreneur, engineer, and inventor. He was the founder and executive chairman of OneWeb and the founder of O3b Networks.

Business ventures 
Wyler spent four years developing telecommunications in Africa in rural locations. In 2003, he built a local team and connected over 200 schools to the Internet, providing the first 3G and fiber to the home connections on the continent. In 2006 his company Terracom acquired 99% control of Rwandatel, although the government of Rwanda then bought Rwandtel back in 2007.

In 2007, he founded O3b Networks, Ltd. The idea was first conceived in 2005 while working on a project to provide a nationwide telephone service in rural Rwanda, attempting to wire the post-war and economically shattered country. O3b has launched 12 satellites, and the system provides the highest capacity and lowest latency combination of any satellites built to date.

In 2012, Wyler founded OneWeb with the mission of "enabling Internet access for everyone".

On 1 August 2016, satellite operator SES S.A. completed the acquisition of O3b Networks.

In March 2020. OneWeb entered Chapter 11 bankruptcy after failing to raise enough capital to complete the build and deployment of its satellite constellation. OneWeb exited bankruptcy with new investment, but Wyler was no longer involved with the company.

 
Wyler founded satellite communications company E-Space in 2022, to create a network of satellites providing services targeting governments and businesses.

Awards and recognition 
In 2015, Wyler received the Arthur C. Clarke award for Innovation and the 2B AHEAD Innovators Award. In 2017, Wyler was voted the Top Rising Star in Wireless by Fierce Wireless and later that year, The Most Powerful Person in Telecommunications. In 2018, he was inducted into the French Legion of Honour.

References 

1969 births
Living people